The Alamo Conference was a short-lived intercollegiate athletic conference composed of member schools located in the state of Texas. The league was established in 1935 with St. Mary's, Sul Ross State, and Texas A&I as charter members. Competition began in 1936 continuing to 1941. Most of the conference's members eventually joined the Lone Star Conference.

Member schools

Final members

Notes

Membership timeline

Football championships

Yearly football standings

References